Happi House is a quick service teriyaki restaurant concept established on February 29, 1976, in San Jose's Japantown neighborhood. Happi House Restaurants, Inc. owns and operates Happi House Teriyaki restaurants throughout the San Francisco Bay Area and Happi House Franchise Corporation is responsible for franchising. The chain's motto is "Where East Meets Fresh," in reference to preparing each meal to order rather than serving pre-prepared items from steam tables.

History 
Joe Ikeda and his business partners, Carlo Besio and Richard Tanaka, were inspired by the foods served during traditional Japanese festivals, and wanted to bring those flavors to the public on a daily basis in a casual and affordable restaurant setting.  The original Happi House Teriyaki restaurant opened February 29, 1976 in San Jose, California's Japantown, at the corner of Fifth Street and Taylor Avenue. It was located just a block from the heart of the annual Obon Festival.

The Happi House name 

Happi House took its name from the traditional Japanese garment the "Happi Coat," which is a colorful cotton jacket worn during festivals and celebrations.  The three founders chose the name because the original inspiration for the chain were the foods served at Japanese festivals where Happi Coats are customary attire.  The first uniforms worn by Happi House employees were happi coats; each hand-sewn by a family member.

Expansion and franchising

During the 1980s and 1990s the chain expanded by franchising and building several company-owned units throughout the Bay Area.  However, Happi House stopped franchising and closed several units after its first attempt at franchising, in an effort to gain greater control over its operations.  In 2007 the company installed a new leadership team, headed up by chief executive officer, Joshua Richman, to grow the brand and return it to franchising.  Richman is a concept developer with restaurant and franchise development experience, joining Happi House after serving as president and CEO of Straw Hat Pizza.

Happi House Franchise Corporation was created in 2008 and is now actively engaged in franchising after re-developing and modernizing several key aspects of the brand, including menu and service systems, marketing, and store design.

In 2021, the Almaden Plaza branch permanently closed leaving only two Happi House restaurants in operation: the original Japantown location on Fifth St. and the McKee Rd. location in Alum Rock.

References

External links
 Official site
  

Restaurant franchises
Restaurants established in 1976
Restaurant chains in the United States
Fast-food chains of the United States
1976 establishments in California
Companies based in San Jose, California
Japanese-American culture in California